Melzo is an unincorporated community in southern Jefferson County, in the U.S. state of Missouri. The community is located on Missouri Route E just north of the Jefferson-St. Francois county line. DeSoto is eight miles to the north and Bone Terre is approximately six miles to the south.

History
A post office called Melzo was established in 1906, and remained in operation until 1938. An early postmaster gave the community the first name of his son, Melzo Higginbotham.

References

Unincorporated communities in Jefferson County, Missouri
Unincorporated communities in Missouri